Coral Edith Browne (23 July 1913 – 29 May 1991) was an Australian-American stage and screen actress. Her extensive theatre credits included Broadway productions of Macbeth (1956), The Rehearsal (1963) and The Right Honourable Gentleman (1965). She won the 1984 BAFTA TV Award for Best Actress for the BBC TV film An Englishman Abroad (1983). Her film appearances included Auntie Mame (1958), The Killing of Sister George (1968), The Ruling Class (1972) and Dreamchild (1985). She was also actor Vincent Price's third wife.

Family
Coral Edith Browne was the only daughter of railway clerk Leslie Clarence Brown (1890–1957), and Victoria Elizabeth Brown (1890–?), née Bennett, both of Victorian birth. She and her two brothers were raised in Footscray, a suburb of Melbourne.

Career

She studied at the National Gallery Art School. Her amateur debut was as Gloria in Shaw's You Never Can Tell, directed by Frank Clewlow.
Gregan McMahon snapped her up for her professional debut as "Margaret Orme" in Loyalties at Melbourne's Comedy Theatre on 2 May 1931, aged 17. She was still billed as "Brown", the "e" being added in 1936.

At the age of 21, with just £50 on her and a letter of introduction to famed actress Marie Tempest from Gregan McMahon, she emigrated to England where she became established as a stage actress, notably as leading lady to Jack Buchanan in Frederick Lonsdale's The Last of Mrs Cheyney, W. Somerset Maugham's Lady Frederick and Alan Melville's Castle in the Air. She was a regular performer in productions at the Savoy Theatre in London and was resident in the hotel for many years, including throughout World War II. When the original British touring production of The Man Who Came to Dinner ran into financial difficulty and could not be produced in London, Browne borrowed money from her dentist and bought the rights to the play, successfully staging it at the Savoy. She received royalties from the play from all future productions.

She began film acting in 1936, with her more famous roles being Vera Charles in Auntie Mame (1958), Mercy Croft in The Killing of Sister George (1968), and Lady Claire Gurney in The Ruling Class (1972). Her television debut came in January 1938, when she appeared in a BBC Television production of The Billiard Room Mystery. Throughout her career, she was a regular performer on BBC Radio and appeared in numerous radio dramas, including Dinner at Eight, The Second Mrs. Tanqueray, The Caspary Affair, The Tragedy of Othello, Oedipus The King, Hamlet, The Infernal Machine, Two Mothers, Captain Brassbound's Conversion and The Eyes of Youth amongst many others. In 1961, Browne was the featured castaway on Desert Island Discs, hosted by Roy Plomley. Television plays for the BBC included Charley's Aunt in 1969, Lady Windermere's Fan in 1972, Mrs. Warren's Profession also in 1972 and The Importance of Being Earnest in 1974.

In 1969, Browne appeared in the poorly received original production of Joe Orton's controversial farce What the Butler Saw in the West End at the Queen's Theatre with Sir Ralph Richardson, Stanley Baxter, and Hayward Morse.

While touring the Soviet Union in a Shakespeare Memorial Theatre (later the Royal Shakespeare Company) production of Hamlet in 1958, she met the spy Guy Burgess. This meeting became the basis of Alan Bennett's script for the television movie An Englishman Abroad (1983) in which Browne played herself, apparently including some of her conversations with Burgess. Burgess, who had found solace in his exile by continually playing the music of Jack Buchanan, asked Browne if she had known Buchanan. "I suppose so", the actress replied, "we nearly got married". On the BFI TV 100, a list compiled in 2000 by the British Film Institute (BFI), chosen by a poll of industry professionals, to determine what were the greatest British television programmes of any genre ever to have been screened, An Englishman Abroad was listed at No. 30.

Her other notable film of this period, Dreamchild (1986) concerned the author Lewis Carroll. In the film, Browne gave an affecting account of the later life of Alice Liddell who had inspired the tale Alice's Adventures in Wonderland.

Browne was portrayed by Prunella Scales on stage in Alan Bennett's adaptation of his play An Englishman Abroad entitled Single Spies. Penelope Wilton took the role of Browne in the BBC radio adaptation of the original film. In a televised documentary Caviar to the General broadcast on UK Channel 4 in 1990, shortly before her death, Coral Browne humorously described her reaction to seeing the stage version of An Englishman Abroad, particularly expressing her irritation at the costumes. She recalled that when she made the film version, the costume designer went to great lengths to find out what she wore at the time the story is set, but when she saw the stage costumes she exclaimed: "I nearly died. Fake fur and hats that wouldn't have come out of a grab bag at the Sally Army on Boxing Day. I was mortified. If the play ever comes to Broadway, I shall go armed with three lawyers and sue. I consider it a defamation". In 2018, an Australian stage play Coral Browne - This F***ing Lady was staged by Maureen Sherlock starring Genevieve Mooy as Browne. Subsequently, Amanda Muggleton took on the part of Browne in later productions of the play.

Personal life
Browne married actor Philip Pearman in 1950, and remained married until his death in 1964. While making the film Theatre of Blood (1973), she met actor Vincent Price; they married on 24 October 1974. The two appeared together in the international stage adaptation of Ardèle, which played in the US as well as in London at the Queen's Theatre. During this run, Browne & Price starred together in the BBC Radio play Night of the Wolf first airing in 1975.  The two subsequently appeared in the 1979 CBS TV miniseries Time Express.

According to her step-daughter Victoria Price, Browne was bisexual. She became a naturalized United States citizen in 1987 as a gift to Price who later converted to Catholicism for her (she had converted many years previously).

Browne died on 29 May 1991 in Los Angeles, California, from breast cancer; she was 77. After her death, she was cremated and her ashes were scattered in the Rose Garden at Hollywood Forever Cemetery. She had no children from her marriages; Price died two years later.

Awards
Browne was awarded the BAFTA Television Award for Best Actress 1984 for her role in An Englishman Abroad. She later received the London Evening Standard British Film Awards for Best Actress in 1986 for Dreamchild. In 1976, the Los Angeles Theatre Critics named her Best Actress for her role in Travesties at the Mark Taper Forum in Los Angeles.

Personality
When told by the Royal Shakespeare Company that there was no suitable role in their upcoming production of King Lear for her husband, Philip Pearman, she demanded a script and running through it she found the page she was looking for. "There you are", she said, "the perfect part. A small camp near Dover."

Browne's language was colourful, and an unauthorized biography of her, This Effing Lady, was published. She was a devout Catholic (by conversion). The two aspects came together in a story of her standing outside Brompton Oratory after Sunday mass when an actor came up to her with gossip about who was sleeping with someone else's wife. She stopped him in his tracks with: "I don't want to hear this filth. Not with me standing here in a state of fucking grace."

Alan Bennett: "When I said to Coral that I’d thought [Cecil] Beaton was gay she remarked, 'Not when he was with me, darling. Like a rat up a drainpipe.'"

The younger Australian performer Barry Humphries paid tribute to Browne at her memorial service with an appropriate poem: "She left behind an emptiness/A gap, a void, a trough/The world is quite a good deal less/Since Coral Browne fucked off."

Biographies
 Browne was the subject of a biography, The Coral Browne Story: Theatrical Life and Times of a Lustrous Australian, by Barbara Angell. This was published May 2007 and launched at the Victorian Arts Centre, Melbourne, on 14 June of that year.
 Coral Browne: 'This Effing Lady''', by Rose Collis, published by Oberon Books, was launched at the Royal National Theatre, 4 October 2007.

In 2018, an Australian stage play Coral Browne – This F***ing Lady was staged by Maureen Sherlock starring Genevieve Mooy as Browne.

Filmography
Film

Television

Notable stage
 A Warm Corner Comedy Theatre, Melbourne c. 1930
 The Roof Comedy Theatre, Melbourne 1931
 Loyalties Comedy Theatre, Melbourne May 1931
 Hay Fever
 The Quaker Girl
 The Apple Cart
 Dear Brutus
 Hedda Gabler
 Children in Uniform Melbourne
 Command to Love Melbourne
 Mated 1934 or 1935
 Lover's Leap, Vaudeville Theatre London 1935
 Basalik, London Arts Theatre Club 1935
 Desirable Residence, Embassy Theatre London 1935
 Heroes Don't Care, St. Martin's Theatre, London 10 June 1936
 The Taming of the Shrew, New London Theatre 1936–1937
 The Great Romancer, New London Theatre 1937
 The Gusher, Prince's Theatre, London 1937
 Believe It Or Not, New Theatre, London March 1940
 The Man Who Came to Dinner, Theatre Royal, Birmingham, England, 17 November 1941
 The Man Who Came to Dinner, Savoy Theatre, London, 4 December 1941–42
 My Sister Eileen, Savoy Theatre, London, 1943
 The Last of Mrs. Cheyney, Savoy Theatre, London 1943–44
 Lady Frederick, Savoy Theatre, London, November 1946
 Lady Frederick, Grand Theatre, Blackpool, 21 April 1947
 Lady Frederick, Theatre Royal, Brighton, 16 June 1947
 Canaries Sometimes Sing, Grand Theatre, Blackpool, 3 November 1947
 Castle in the Air, Adelphi Theatre, London, 1949–50
 Othello, Old Vic Theatre, London, 31 October 1951
 King Lear, Old Vic, London, 3 March 1952
 Affairs of State, Theatre Royal, Brighton, 28 July 1952
 Affairs of State, Cambridge Theatre, Cambridge Circus, 21 August 1952
 Affairs of State, Hippodrome, Bristol, 1953–54
 Simon And Laura, Strand Theatre, London, 1954
 Nina Theatre Royal Haymarket, London, 27 July 1955
 Macbeth Old Vic, London, 1955–56
 Macbeth Hippodrome, Bristol, 1955–56
 Tamburlaine the Greatm Playbill Winter Garden Theatre, New York, 19 January – 4 February 1956
 Tamburlaine the Great, Stratford, Ontario, Canada
 Macbeth, Winter Garden Theatre, New York, 29 October 1956 – 12 January 1957
 Troilus and Cressida, Winter Garden Theatre, New York, 26 December 1956 – 12 January 1957
 Hamlet, Old Vic, London, 1957–58
 A Midsummer Night's Dream, Old Vic, London, 1957–58
 The Pleasure of His Company, Theatre Royal Haymarket, London, 1957–58
 Toys in the Attic, Piccadilly Theatre, London, 10 November 1960
 Bonne Soupe, The Comedy Theatre London, 1960
 Bonne Soupe, New Theatre, Oxford, 26 September 1961
 Bonne Soupe, Wyndham's Theatre London, 13 February 1962
 The Rehearsal, Royale Theatre, New York, 23 September – 28 December 1963
 The Right Honourable Gentleman, Billy Rose Theatre, New York, 19 October 1965 – 22 January 1966
 Lady Windermere's Fan, Phoenix Theatre, London, 1966
 Lady Windermere's Fan, Theatre Royal, Brighton, 23 August 1966
 What the Butler Saw, Queen's Theatre, London, 1969
 My Darling Daisy, Lyric Theatre, London, 1970
 Mrs. Warren's Profession, Old Vic, London, 1970–71
 The Sea, Royal Court, London, 1973–74
 The Waltz of the Toreadors Theatre Royal Haymarket, London, 1974
 Ardèle, Queen's Theatre, London, 1975
 Charley's Aunt, Cirque Dinner Theatre, Seattle, 12 August 1975
 Charley's Aunt Granny's Dinner Theatre, Dallas, 16 March – 10 April 1976
 Charley's Aunt, National U.S. tour, 10 May – 26 June 1976
 The Importance of Being Earnest, Mark Taper Forum, Los Angeles, 1976
 Travesties, Mark Taper Forum, Los Angeles, 1976

References

Works cited
 Coral Browne: 'This Effing Lady' (2007) by Rose Collis, Oberon Books, 
 The Coral Browne Story (2007) by Barbara Angell,  
 Vincent Price: A Daughter's Biography  (1999) by Victoria Price, 
 Who's Who (1991 edition) St. Martin's Press, 1991, p. 241
 Variety, 3 June 1991, p. 69
 The Daily Telegraph'' obituary (31 May 1991)

External links

 Coral Browne Collection at the Performing Arts Collection, Arts Centre Melbourne
 
 
 

1913 births
1991 deaths
American film actresses
American stage actresses
American television actresses
American voice actresses
Australian emigrants to the United States
Australian stage actresses
Australian film actresses
Australian television actresses
Australian voice actresses
Actresses from Melbourne
Best Actress BAFTA Award (television) winners
Deaths from cancer in California
Converts to Roman Catholicism
Deaths from breast cancer
20th-century American actresses
Burials at Hollywood Forever Cemetery
American Roman Catholics
Australian Roman Catholics
20th-century Australian women
People from Footscray, Victoria